The Super may refer to:
 The Super (1991 film), an American comedy film
 The Super (2017 film), an American horror thriller film
 The Super (TV series), an American sitcom television series
 Building superintendent, or "the super"
 "The Super", a story from the graphic novel A Contract with God

See also 
 Super (disambiguation)
 El Super